Kryptopterus piperatus is a species of Asian glass catfish from rivers in northern Sumatra, Indonesia.  It was first described in 2004.  True K. piperatus is rarely (if ever) seen in the aquarium trade, while K. vitreolus is common.

Among described species of Kryptopterus, only three species are clearly transparent: K. vitreolus, K. minor and K. piperatus.  The body of others, including K. bicirrhis, are only somewhat translucent or opaque.

References

Siluridae
Catfish of Asia
Freshwater fish of Indonesia
Fish described in 2004